American Mineralogist: An International Journal of Earth and Planetary Materials is a peer-reviewed scientific journal covering the general fields of mineralogy, crystallography, geochemistry, and petrology. It is an official journal of the Mineralogical Society of America, publishing both subscription and open access articles. The journal is a hybrid open-access journal. The editors-in-chief are Hongwu Xu (Los Alamos National Laboratory), and Don Baker (McGill University).

History
The journal was established in 1916, with the first issue appearing in July of that year, under the auspices of the Philadelphia Mineralogical Society, the New York Mineralogical Club, and the Mineral Collectors' Association. On December 30, 1919, the Mineralogical Society of America was formed and American Mineralogist became the society's journal.

Abstracting and indexing 
The American Mineralogist is abstracted and indexed in Chemical Abstracts, the Science Citation Index, GeoRef, and INSPEC. According to the Journal Citation Reports, the journal has a 2011 impact factor of 2.100.

Crystallographic database

A database, the American Mineralogist Crystal Structure Database, of all crystal structures published in American Mineralogist, Canadian Mineralogist, and the European Journal of Mineralogy is maintained and hosted at the University of Arizona with the Mineralogical Society of America, and the Mineralogical Society of Canada.

References

External links 
 

Geology journals
Publications established in 1916
English-language journals
8 times per year journals